E.Town Concrete, or sometimes called E-Town, is an American hardcore punk band from Elizabeth, New Jersey. They formed in 1995 and shortly thereafter released Time 2 Shine, their first full-length album, in 1999 on the Resurrection A.D. label. They have since released four more albums on various record labels, such as Razor & Tie and Ironbound Recordings. The band broke up in 2006, playing their last show on May 20 of that year.

On October 12, 2008, the band's Myspace page indicated that "The Return" was coming. Two reunion shows at Starland Ballroom in Sayreville, New Jersey were announced on October 13, 2008 scheduled for February 20 and 21, 2009. They played Starland Ballroom again on February 13, 2010 with The Acacia Strain, Ill Bill, Reign Supreme, Razorblade Handgrenade and others. They returned for a fourth time to play at Starland Ballroom with Hatebreed on January 8, 2011.

The band returned to Starland Ballroom on February 17, 2012, with native New York Hardcore bands Biohazard and Madball as opening acts. A new, self-released, EP (four tracks) was sold at the show. The following year they played with 40 Below Summer, Bane, a reunited Nora, and Judge the Fallen.

According to an interview given by Anthony Martini to radio station WSOU on February 13, 2015, the band is now in retirement, and is not actively working on any new material or touring. However, as a tradition the band plays a show in New Jersey once a year, and will occasionally play festivals "for fun". The band has played a number of different festivals all across America such as This is Hardcore in Philadelphia and FYA fest in Tampa. At their Starland Ballroom show on October 8th 2022, the band confirmed that a new song had not been released yet. It is currently known as "Level Up" and the band played it live for the first time. This will more than likely be some of the band's first new material in nearly 20 years.

Members
Current
Anthony Martini – vocals (1995–Present)
David "DeLux" Mondragon – guitar (1995–Present)
Eric DeNault – bass (1997–Present)
Theodore "Ted P." Panagopoulos – drums (1995–Present)

Former
Ken Pescatore – guitar (1995–1998)
Henry W. Hess IV – bass (1995–1997)

Discography

References

Other sources
 "E. Town Concrete Reunites at Starland Ballroom" - Asbury Park Press

External links 
 E.Town Concrete at Resurrection A.D.
 E.Town Concrete at Purevolume

Rapcore groups
Rap metal musical groups
Hardcore punk groups from New Jersey
Triple Crown Records artists